Northern Fleet is a 1988 video game published by Simulations Canada.

Gameplay
Northern Fleet is a game in which modern naval operations in the North Atlantic are simulated.

Reception
M. Evan Brooks reviewed the game for Computer Gaming World, and stated that "In Northern Fleet, much of what is happening is hidden behind the immutable source code of the computer. Nevertheless, it is a clear success as it presents the "appearance" of historical accuracy."

References

External links
Review in VideoGames & Computer Entertainment

1988 video games
Apple II games
Atari ST games
Classic Mac OS games
Cold War video games
Commodore 64 games
Computer wargames
DOS games
Naval video games
Simulations Canada video games
Turn-based strategy video games
Video games developed in Canada
Video games set in 1996
Video games set in the future